Omar Navarro (born January 9, 1989) is an American perennial candidate for the seat of California's 43rd congressional district against longtime Democratic congresswoman Maxine Waters. A member of the Republican Party, Navarro ran unsuccessfully against Waters in 2016, 2018, 2020, and 2022.

Life

Early life 
Navarro was born and raised in Inglewood, California. He spent a significant portion of his life in Hawthorne and Torrance. Navarro's parents are Mexican and Cuban immigrants.

Career 
Navarro is an independent business owner in the tech industry specializing in marketing. Navarro served as volunteer traffic commissioner for Torrance, California.

Electoral history

2016
After declaring for Congress, Navarro was defeated by Waters with 76.1% of the vote. The district includes parts of L.A., Torrance, Carson, Gardena, Hawthorne, Inglewood, Lawndale and Lomita.

2018
Navarro challenged Waters for her seat in 2018. He was again defeated, with Waters receiving 77.7% of the vote to Navarro's 22.3%.

Navarro's campaign raised more than $450,000 in the third quarter and spent $11,845 on rental fees and meals at the Trump National Golf Club in Rancho Palos Verdes as well as multiple stays at the Trump International Hotel in Las Vegas. Navarro received national attention for raising over $1,000,000 during his 2018 campaign as a whole.

2020
In the March 3, 2020, California primary, Navarro failed to qualify for the general election, finishing third with 10.9% of the total vote. Waters received 78.1% of the vote with Republican Joe Collins finishing second with 11.1%. Navarro was unable to campaign at the time of the primary as he was incarcerated; however, he still raised $500000 in donations.

2022
On January 11, 2021, Navarro announced that he would be challenging Waters again in 2022. In the June 7, 2022, California primary, Navarro finished second to Waters with 13.2% of the total vote. In the general election, Waters received 77.3% of the vote with Navarro receiving 22.7%, marking the fourth consecutive election cycle that Navarro has been defeated. Following this loss, Navarro announced he was moving to Florida.

Endorsements

Navarro has had endorsements from Roger Stone, Michael Flynn, Joe Arpaio, Herman Cain, and Alex Jones, among others. He met Flynn in person in February 2018, while in Washington to attend the Conservative Political Action Conference.

Conspiracy theories 
In October 2020, Navarro tweeted "Where we go one, we go all", a slogan adopted by the community surrounding the QAnon conspiracy theory.  He also made at least one tweet in 2016 promoting the Pizzagate conspiracy theory.

Criminal history

Pepper spraying of children
In 2017, while he was a volunteer for the Torrance Traffic Commission, Navarro was involved in the pepper-spraying of a child at a pro-sanctuary-cities event in Cudahy, California. Video of the incident showed Navarro in the back seat of a car while the driver and another passenger sprayed the surrounding protestors. At first, he denied spraying the crowd, but he resigned after the Torrance City Council began the process of removing him. During his resignation statement to the Torrance City Council, Navarro accused Mayor Patrick Furey of being a pawn of Maxine Waters.

Electronic tracking device
Navarro was convicted for attaching an electronic tracking device to his wife's car on February 14, 2016. He pleaded guilty to the misdemeanor charge in Orange County and was sentenced to a day in jail and 18 months’ probation in September 2016. He was also ordered to take an anger management course. He was on probation until March 2018.

Navarro was found guilty only two weeks before the 2016 election. Before Navarro pleaded guilty, he blamed the Orange County District Attorney's Office and the media for spreading fake news.

Forged letter
Navarro released a fraudulent letter on his Twitter account that indicated Maxine Waters wanted to resettle tens of thousands of refugees into her Los Angeles district. The letter appeared to be printed on Waters' House office stationery and looked as if written by her, bearing her signature, alleging that she was in communication with CAIR-LA (a Los Angeles-based chapter of the Council on American-Islamic Relations) and Hussam Ayloush (the executive director of CAIR-LA) to relocate refugees in Los Angeles. The letter contained several inaccuracies, including references to committees and subcommittees on which Waters does not serve, and listing an address for a district office that had been closed for nearly a decade.

Navarro was interrogated by the FBI and Capitol Police regarding the matter. He told the Los Angeles Times that he did not fabricate the letter and claimed that he received it from a person whose name he would not reveal and with whom he had not been in touch since he received the letter.

Restraining order, alleged stalking, and incarceration
On August 1, 2019, a restraining order was issued against Navarro for five years for his former girlfriend, conservative activist DeAnna Lorraine Tesoriero, who is publicly known as DeAnna Lorraine. In the ruling, the judge cited Navarro's "harassing and stalking" behavior towards Tesoriero. This is Navarro's second restraining order against a former partner in two years as one was previously issued in 2017 for his ex-wife.

On December 7, 2019, Navarro attempted to meet with Lorraine and was charged with stalking, criminal threats, attempted extortion (all felonies), and violating a restraining order (a misdemeanor). On December 12, 2019, Navarro was remanded into custody on a further seven charges by San Francisco County Superior Court judge Suzanne Bolanos for being a threat to public safety, and he was ordered to undergo a psychiatric evaluation. He pleaded guilty to one charge and served six months in prison.

References 

Living people
1989 births
California Republicans
People from Inglewood, California
American politicians of Cuban descent
American politicians of Mexican descent
California politicians convicted of crimes
People from Torrance, California
Candidates in the 2022 United States House of Representatives elections
Candidates in the 2020 United States elections
Candidates in the 2018 United States elections
Candidates in the 2016 United States elections
21st-century American politicians
Latino conservatism in the United States